Lorenzo the cat is a feline model who has appeared in the Miami Herald, New York Daily News, The Boston Globe, The Seattle Times, The Times of India, Yahoo! News, and several talk shows. Lorenzo's modeling has been featured on the Today Show website and Associated Press.

Overview and history
Lorenzo, a Maine Coon born on Halloween, was adopted from a foster home at four weeks old by Joann Biondi. Shortly after adoption, Lorenzo began making his first appearances on news channels and fashion shows. Lorenzo's abilities were discovered purely by accident  when Biondi made him wear a tank top one day as a punishment for stealing dirty clothes from the laundry basket and dragging them all around the apartment. In an interview with CNN, Biondi said, "As it turned out, this was not a very effective punishment because Lorenzo was not fazed by the shirt. Quite to the contrary, he loved it! And thus, his modeling career was born".

Lorenzo the cat has pages on MySpace and Facebook, and maintained an active account on Youtube. The feline model is still active on Twitter, posting in March of 2023 with 66.8k followers. His last Youtube video from 2010 has 21k views. His outfits often engage in both social and political commentaries as well as humor and fashion. These days, he has his own personal tailor—Mr. Luigi of Tuscany—who hand sews all the clothes that the cat wears during his photo shoots.

Career
Biondi claims that despite Lorenzo's sweet personality and his eagerness to please, sometimes Lorenzo's natural feline habits make the photography sessions more challenging. According to Lorenzo's website, which Biondi maintains, the shoots can last a few days or take up to a few weeks depending on Lorenzo's level of cooperation. As Biondi acknowledges: "Although Lorenzo enjoys posing, he is still a cat, which means that during a shoot he often wants to chase lizards, tear down backdrops, groom his tail, or take a nap".

Recognition
Lorenzo has been recognized in several different forms of media, from local papers to international television networks. Some publication credits include:
 The Stylist (fashion magazine)
 National Geographic Kids
 AppleSeeds (children's magazine)
 Globo (Brazilian T.V. network)
 Naples Florida Weekly
 Univision
 CBS News Sunday Morning

See also
 List of individual cats

References

Cats in art
Individual cats in the United States